Minuscule 293 (in the Gregory-Aland numbering), ε 365 (Soden), is a Greek minuscule manuscript of the New Testament, on parchment. It is dated by a colophon to the year 1262. 
Scrivener wrongly deciphered this as November 1373. 
It has marginalia.

Description 

The codex contains almost complete text of the four Gospels on 340 parchment leaves, with lacunae (Mark 1:1-3:8). The text is written in one column per page, in 19-23 lines per page, by several different hands. Mark 1:1-3:8 was supplied by a later hand.

There is also another division according to the Ammonian Sections (in Mark 241 - 16:20), but without references to the Eusebian Canons.

It is ornamented with silver.

It is a palimpsest. The lower text was written in uncial letters, in two columns. It was Evangelistarion-Lectionary, dated palaeographically to the 9th or 10th century. The upper text of the palimpsest is the text of minuscule 293.

Text 

The Greek text of the codex is a representative of the Byzantine text-type. Hermann von Soden classified it to the textual family Kx. Aland placed it in Category V.

According to the Claremont Profile Method it represents the textual group M1195 in Luke 1, Luke 10, and Luke 20, as a weak member.

History 

The manuscript was written by Manuel at the suggestion of Blasius, a monk. It was added to the list of New Testament manuscripts by Scholz (1794–1852). 
It was examined and described by Paulin Martin. C. R. Gregory saw it in 1885.

The manuscript is currently housed at the Bibliothèque nationale de France (Gr. 117) at Paris.

See also 

 List of New Testament minuscules
 Biblical manuscript
 Textual criticism

References

Further reading 

 

Greek New Testament minuscules
13th-century biblical manuscripts
Bibliothèque nationale de France collections